Henrik Bødker (born 6 June 1983) is a Danish football midfielder, who currently plays for the Danish side KFUM Roskilde.

References

External links
Henrik Bødker on Næstved BK website
Official Danish Superliga stats
Career statistics at Danmarks Radio

1983 births
Living people
Danish men's footballers
FC Nordsjælland players
SønderjyskE Fodbold players
Vejle Boldklub Kolding players
KFUM Roskilde players
Danish expatriates in Iceland
Danish Superliga players
Danish 1st Division players
Expatriate footballers in Iceland

Association football midfielders